Andrew Pohl (born 20 March 1989) is a New Zealand cross-country skier.

He represented New Zealand at the FIS Nordic World Ski Championships 2015 in Falun.

References

External links 
 

1989 births
Living people
New Zealand male cross-country skiers